Lawrence Henry Smith (September 15, 1892January 22, 1958) was a U.S. Representative from Wisconsin.

Born in Racine, Wisconsin, Smith attended the public schools and Milwaukee State Teachers College. He graduated from the Marquette University Law School, Milwaukee, Wisconsin, in 1923. He was admitted to the bar the same year and commenced the practice of law in Racine, Wisconsin.

During the First World War he served as a first lieutenant of Infantry, Thirty-second Division from 1917 to 1919.

Smith was elected as a Republican to the Seventy-seventh Congress to fill the vacancy caused by the death of Stephen Bolles. He represented Wisconsin's 1st congressional district.
He was reelected to the Seventy-eighth and to the seven succeeding Congresses and served from August 29, 1941, until his death in the United States Capitol, Washington, D.C., January 22, 1958, when he collapsed in the House restaurant during a heart attack.
Smith voted against the Civil Rights Act of 1957. He was interred in West Lawn Memorial Park, Racine, Wisconsin.

See also
 List of United States Congress members who died in office (1950–99)

References

External links

1892 births
1958 deaths
Politicians from Racine, Wisconsin
Military personnel from Wisconsin
University of Wisconsin–Milwaukee alumni
Marquette University Law School alumni
Wisconsin lawyers
Republican Party members of the United States House of Representatives from Wisconsin
20th-century American politicians
20th-century American lawyers